Lizardi is a surname of Basque origin. Notable people with the surname include:

Diego Lizardi (1975–2008), Puerto Rican athlete
Reinaldo Lizardi (born 1954), Venezuelan sprinter

References

Basque-language surnames